Sầm Sơn is a resort city in north-central Vietnam, situated 16 km east of Thanh Hóa Province capital, Thanh Hóa, on the shore of the South China Sea.

The French colonial rulers began exploiting Sầm Sơn in 1906, and it became a famous place in what was then French Indochina. At that time, many holiday villas were constructed here. In April/May 2007, Sầm Sơn celebrated the 100th anniversary of its establishment by organizing a Sầm Sơn Festival. The Thanh Hóa provincial government invested US$375,000 to upgrade infrastructure along the sea, on water supply, lighting systems and an information network to prepare for the festival. About  22 training courses were organized for 3,000 cyclists, cameramen, vendors and tourist guides. 

As of 2003 the district-level town had a population of 57,625. The district covers an area of 18 km².

From 14 May 2015, the town was extended on the basis of the merger of 6 communes of Quang Xuong District.

From 19 April 2017, this town upgrade to city.

References

Populated places in Thanh Hóa province
Districts of Thanh Hóa province
Cities in Vietnam